Robert Morgan Illman is an American attorney and jurist serving as a U.S. Magistrate Judge of the United States District Court for the Northern District of California since 2017.

Education
Illman graduated with a Bachelor of Arts degree in history from Covenant College in Lookout Mountain, Georgia and a Juris Doctor from the University of Alabama School of Law in Tuscaloosa, Alabama.

Career
Following law school, Illman practiced law for four years in Montgomery, Alabama as an assistant federal public defender from 2003 to 2007, where he represented indigent defendants charged with various crimes in federal trial and appellate courts, and also represented Alabama's death row inmates in their federal habeas corpus litigation.

From 2007 to 2014, Illman served as a judicial law clerk for the Judge Wallace Capel, Jr., chief U.S. Magistrate Judge of the U.S. District Court for the Middle District of Alabama.

From 2014 to 2017, Illman served as a judicial law clerk for Judge Nandor J. Vadas.

Judicial service
On November 6, 2017, Illman was appointed as a U.S. Magistrate Judge for the Northern District of California. He assumed the magistrate judgeship vacated by retiring Eureka Division U.S. Magistrate Judge Nandor J. Vadas.

Judge Illman currently serves in the Eureka Division of the Northern District of California at the Eureka-McKinleyville Courthouse located in McKinleyville, California. As a result, all new civil and criminal actions arising in the counties of Del Norte, Lake, Humboldt, and Mendocino are assigned directly to Illman, subject to consent under 28 USC § 636(c)(1).

References

External links
The Honorable Robert M. Illman, U.S. Magistrate Judge, United States District Court for the Northern District of California
New Magistrate Judge Robert M. Illman Takes the Bench

Year of birth missing (living people)
Living people
Covenant College alumni
University of Alabama School of Law alumni
American lawyers
United States magistrate judges
21st-century American judges